Dagored is an Italian record label based in Firenze, formed in 1998.

They specialise in film soundtrack issues, including those produced by Ennio Morricone, Nico Fidenco, Bruno Nicolai and Les Reed.

Releases 
As of 2008, Dagored has released 79 titles (some were issued both on LP and CD formats):

References 

Italian record labels
Record labels established in 1998